Carton is a surname. Notable people and characters with the surname include:

People:
 Craig Carton (born 1969), American radio personality
 Davy Carton (born 1959), Irish singer, songwriter and rhythm guitarist
 Gordon Carton (1921–2017), Canadian politician
 John J. Carton (1856–1934), American politician
 Michael Carton (born 1984), Irish hurler
 Noel Carton (born 1981), Irish hurling goalkeeper
 Paul Carton (1875–1947), French physician
 Pauline Carton (1884–1974), French film actress
 Peadar Carton, Irish hurler
 Raoul Carton, French philosopher
 Rick Carton (born 1967), American book illustrator
 Victor Carton (1902–1970), Irish politician

Fictional characters:
 Sydney Carton, hero of Charles Dickens' novel A Tale of Two Cities

See also

 Carlon
 Cartan (disambiguation), a surname (and a crater)
 Cartin, a surname
 Carton de Wiart, a surname of Belgian origin
 McCartan, a surname of Irish origin believed to be the forefather of Carton